Tjörn Municipality (Tjörns kommun) is a municipality that covers the island of Tjörn in Västra Götaland County in western Sweden. Its seat is located in the town of Skärhamn.

Tjörn is the sixth largest Swedish island. It is located in the province of Bohuslän.

The former municipal entities on the island and adjacent islets were united to form Tjörn Municipality in 1952.

For centuries the local economy was dominated by fishing and boat building. The largest employers are still the shipping company TransAtlantic (formerly known as B&N) and the shipyards Djupviks varv and Rönnängs varv.

Geography
Tjörn is connected in the east to the town of Stenungsund on the mainland by the Tjörn bridge, and in the north to the island of Orust by the Skåpesund bridge. The municipal seat is Skärhamn. Other communities, many of which are the fishing communities, include Rönnäng, Klädesholmen and Kyrkesund. The island of Mjörn, north-east of Tjörn, has large shell banks.

Localities
Bleket
Dyrön
Klädesholmen
Kyrkesund
Kållekärr
Myggenäs
Rönnäng
Skärhamn
Åstol

Tourism

During the summer, the population swells from 10,000 to 20,000 to 30,000 as vacationers arrive for yachting and swimming. Skärhamn has an ample guest harbour to accommodate yachters travelling along the Swedish west coast. The town of Skärhamn is the location of the Nordic Watercolour Museum (Akvarellmuseet).

See also
Tjörn Hundred

References

External links

Official site

Municipalities of Västra Götaland County
Metropolitan Gothenburg
Gothenburg and Bohus